5 Years of Mau5 is a greatest hits and remix album by Canadian electronic music producer Deadmau5. It was released on November 24, 2014, in celebration of the five-year anniversary of his label, Mau5trap. Like his previous studio album, While(1<2) the retrospective was released in double disc format. The first disc acts as a greatest hits album encompassing highlights from the past five years of his back catalog, while the second disc serves as a remix album featuring exclusive and new remixes from various artists. The album artwork features a combination of the 'Mau5heads' used in the cover art of his first four studio albums released through the label: Random Album Title, For Lack of a Better Name, 4×4=12 and Album Title Goes Here.

Track listing

Notes
 The original track listing was meant to feature the Wolfgang Gartner collaboration "Animal Rights" instead of "Not Exactly",  as well as a remix of "Word Problems" by Friend Within (which was not finished in time for the album's release) in place of Wax Motif's Remix of "Raise Your Weapon". 
 NERO's remix of "Ghosts 'n' Stuff" and Madeon's remix of "Raise Your Weapon" were originally released in 2009 and 2011, respectively.
 The deadmau5 vs Eric Prydz remix for "The Veldt" and the Michael Cassette remix for "Raise Your Weapon" were both initially recorded around 2012 and originally released around 2013, but neither were officially released before the album.

Charts

Weekly charts

Year-end charts

Release history

References

External links
 
 

Deadmau5 albums
2014 compilation albums
2014 greatest hits albums
2014 remix albums
Mau5trap albums
Ultra Records albums
Virgin Records albums